Hacımusalar can refer to:

 Hacımusalar, Elmalı
 Hacımusalar, Mudurnu